During the 1997–98 Dutch football season, AFC Ajax competed in the Eredivisie.

Season summary
After the previous season's disappointing fourth place, Ajax regrouped to win the Eredivisie, finishing 17 points ahead of runners-up PSV Eindhoven, and the KNVB Cup, thrashing PSV 5-0 in the final.

Players

First-team squad
Squad at end of season

Left club during season

Jong Ajax

Transfers

In
  Ole Tobiasen -  Heerenveen, 26 June, DKK7,500,000
  Michael Laudrup -  Vissel Kobe
  Dean Gorré -  Groningen
  Andrzej Rudy -  Lierse
  Sunday Oliseh -  1. FC Köln
  Shota Arveladze -  Trabzonspor
  Gerald Sibon -  Roda JC
  Benni McCarthy -  Seven Stars

Out
  Milan Berck Beelenkamp -  FC Volendam
  Winston Bogarde -  A.C. Milan
  Arnold Scholten -  JEF United Ichihara
  John Veldman -  Vitesse
  Menno Willems -  Vitesse
  Márcio Santos -  Atlético Mineiro
  Kiki Musampa -  Bordeaux
  Marc Overmars -  Arsenal, 18 June
  Martijn Reuser -  Vitesse, loan
  Dennis Schulp -  FC Volendam
  Rob Gehring -  Rayo Vallecano
  Dave van den Bergh -  Rayo Vallecano
  Nordin Wooter -  Real Zaragoza
  Patrick Kluivert -  A.C. Milan, free
  Iván Gabrich -  Mérida
  Hayden Foxe -  Arminia Bielefeld

References

Notes

AFC Ajax seasons
AFC Ajax
Dutch football championship-winning seasons